The Berber toad, also known as Mauritanian toad, Moroccan toad, pantherine toad or Moorish toad (Sclerophrys mauritanica), is a species of toad in the family Bufonidae, which is found in north-western Africa, with an introduced population in southern Spain.

Description
The Berber toad is a large toad, reaching 13–15 cm in body length. The upperparts are beige to olive with large orange or red spots. The underparts are white with small grey spots. It can be found in a variety of colour morphs, with the back colour varies from dark patches of brown, olive, orange, or reddish brown to just a plain sandy colour.

Distribution
The Berber toad is found in north western Africa, occurring in Morocco eastwards through Algeria into Tunisia, and south to the northernmost part of Western Sahara, although this has yet to be confirmed.  An introduced population is also present in Spain close to Los Alcornocales Natural Park in the vicinity of Algeciras.

Habitat
Its natural habitats are subtropical or tropical dry cork oak forests, subtropical or tropical dry shrubland, rivers, freshwater marshes, intermittent freshwater marshes, arable land, pastureland, plantations and urban areas.  Berber toads range up to 2,650 m above sea level in the Atlas Mountains.

Habits
It breeds in fresh or brackish still or slow-flowing bodies of water. The females deposit approximately 5,000–10,000 eggs. During the day the adults hide under rocks or in tunnels.

Taxonomy
Originally placed in the genus Bufo but was placed in the African genus Amietophrynus for the former 20-chromosome "Bufo"  in 2009 and then Amietophrynus was renamed Sclerophrys as the type species Sclerophrys capensis was named as such, so Amietophrynus is a junior synonym of Sclerophrys.

References

mauritanica
Amphibians of North Africa
Amphibians described in 1841
Taxa named by Hermann Schlegel
Taxonomy articles created by Polbot